Abd ar-Rahman IV Mortada was the Caliph of Córdoba in the Umayyad dynasty in Al-Andalus, succeeding Sulayman ibn al-Hakam, in 1018. That same year, he was murdered at Cadiz while fleeing from a battle in which he had been deserted by the very supporters which had brought him into power. His brief reign was similar to that of Abd ar-Rahman V Mostadir.

References

|-

Umayyad caliphs of Córdoba
1018 deaths
11th-century caliphs of Córdoba
Year of birth unknown